Robin Hack (born 27 August 1998) is a German professional footballer who plays as a forward for Bundesliga club Arminia Bielefeld.

Career
In June 2019, Hack signed for 1. FC Nürnberg from 1899 Hoffenheim.

After two seasons with Nürnberg, Hack transferred to Arminia Bielefeld in August 2021, signing until 2025.

References

External links
 
 
 
 

1998 births
Living people
Sportspeople from Pforzheim
German footballers
Germany youth international footballers
Association football forwards
TSG 1899 Hoffenheim II players
TSG 1899 Hoffenheim players
1. FC Nürnberg players
Arminia Bielefeld players
Regionalliga players
Bundesliga players
2. Bundesliga players
Footballers from Baden-Württemberg
Germany under-21 international footballers
21st-century German people